The 2016 KBO League season was the 35th season in the history of the Korea Professional Baseball League.

Season structure

Stadium changes for 2016 season
The Nexen Heroes left the 12,500-seat Mokdong Baseball Stadium and began play in the newly built 17,000-seat Gocheok Sky Dome.
The Samsung Lions left the 10,000-seat Daegu Baseball Stadium and began play in the newly built 24,000-seat Daegu Samsung Lions Park.
Munhak Baseball Stadium, home of the SK Wyverns, was fitted with a 12,257 square feet scoreboard before the start of the season

Regular season
Each KBO team played 144 games during the regular season with all teams playing each other 16 times. The 144-game-schedule began in the 2015 season due to the addition of the KT Wiz. During the 2014 season, each team had played 128 games.

All-Star Game
On July 16, the best players participated in the 2016 KBO All-Star Game at Gocheok Sky Dome in Seoul. The participating franchises were divided into two regions, the Dream All-Stars (Samsung Lions, Doosan Bears, Lotte Giants, SK Wyverns, KT Wiz) and Nanum All-Stars (Kia Tigers, Hanwha Eagles, LG Twins, Nexen Heroes, NC Dinos). The Nanum All-Star team emerged victorious with an 8–4 victory over the Dream All-Star Team in front of a sold-out crowd of 16, 300 fans. Doosan Bears outfielder Min Byung-hun, who hit two home runs during the game, was named the MVP of the game. The KBO All-Star Game however does not determine home-field advantage in the Korean Series.

Postseason
The 2016 KBO League season culminates in its championship series, known as the Korean Series. Before the 2015 season, the Semi-playoff format was tweaked. Previously, the top four teams after the end of the regular season qualified for the postseason, but in 2015, the top five teams qualified for the postseason. The team with the best record gained a direct entry into the Korean Series, while the other four teams competed for the remaining place in a step-ladder playoff system. Starting in 2015, the fourth-place and the fifth-place teams played in a "Wildcard" game/series.

Procedure to Determine Final Standings
Champion (first place): Korean Series Winner
Runner-up (second place): Korean Series Loser
Third–Tenth place: Regular Season records determine third to tenth place spots in Final Standings

Standings

Source

Postseason

Wild Card
The series started with a 1–0 advantage for the fourth-placed team.

Semi-playoff

Playoff

Korean Series

Foreign players
Each team could have signed up to three foreign players. Due to the high proportion of pitchers signed in previous years, beginning in 2014 the league mandated that at least one of the foreign players must be a position player. Also with the KT Wiz being an expansion team that started play in 2015, they were given an exemption and were allowed to sign four foreign players instead of just the normally allowed three.

Foreign hitters

Attendances

References

External links
Official website

KBO League seasons
KBO League season
KBO League season